Lila Tan Hui Ying (born 4 June 2003) is a Singaporean footballer who plays as a midfielder for Lion City Sailors.

Early life and education 
Tan was born to a Singaporean father, a business consultant, and a French mother,  a corporate general manager. Tan is the eldest child with three younger brothers. She spent fourteen years in Shanghai, China before moving back to Singapore in 2020 during the COVID-19 pandemic.

After moving back to Singapore, Tan studied at Hillside World Academy.

Career
Tan had a clothing brand, aiheartyou.

Modelling career 
Tan worked as a freelance model and then signed up with a modelling agency. She was a 2021 Miss Universe Singapore finalist.

Football career

Club career 
As a youth player, Tan joined the youth academy of Chinese side AKSIL. In 2022, she signed for Lion City Sailors in Singapore.

International career 
On the sports front, Lila was called up for trials with in 2020. She was later selected for the national team for the AFC Women's Asian Cup qualification matches held at Tajikistan in September 2021.

References

2003 births
Expatriate women's footballers in China
Living people
Singapore women's international footballers
Singaporean female models
Singaporean people of French descent
Singaporean women's footballers
Women's association football midfielders